Ivica Todorov, known in France as Yves Todorov (born 4 July 1950) is a Serbian-French football coach who manages Arab Contractors.

He previously coached the Congo national side, a job which he took up in April 2008. He has previously managed some French teams, the Burkino Faso national side, as well as club sides including FUS Rabat of Morocco and Étoile du Sahel of Tunisia and FC 105 Libreville of Gabon.

References

External links

Profile

Living people
1950 births
Yugoslav emigrants to France
Sportspeople from Zrenjanin
Serbian footballers
Association football midfielders
FK Proleter Zrenjanin players
RFK Novi Sad 1921 players
Red Star Belgrade footballers
Limoges FC players
Royal Excel Mouscron players
Stade Français (association football) players
Yugoslav football managers
Serbian football managers
Saudi Professional League managers
Limoges FC managers
Stade Brestois 29 managers
Étoile Sportive du Sahel managers
Najran SC managers
Fath Union Sport managers
Congo national football team managers
Al Mokawloon Al Arab SC managers
Wydad AC managers
Yugoslav expatriate sportspeople in Gabon
Expatriate football managers in Gabon
Expatriate footballers in France
Expatriate football managers in France
Serbian expatriate sportspeople in Gabon
Expatriate footballers in West Germany
Serbian expatriate sportspeople in the United Arab Emirates
Expatriate football managers in the United Arab Emirates
Serbian expatriate sportspeople in Saudi Arabia
Expatriate football managers in Saudi Arabia
Expatriate football managers in the Republic of the Congo
Serbian expatriate sportspeople in Egypt
Expatriate football managers in Egypt
Serbian expatriate sportspeople in Morocco
Expatriate football managers in Morocco
Botola managers
Yugoslav expatriate footballers
Yugoslav expatriate sportspeople in West Germany
Yugoslav expatriate sportspeople in France
Yugoslav expatriate sportspeople in Belgium
Expatriate footballers in Belgium
Serbian expatriate sportspeople in the Republic of the Congo
Serbian expatriate sportspeople in Burkina Faso
Expatriate football managers in Burkina Faso